Dutch–Finnish relations are foreign relations between the Netherlands and Finland. the Netherlands recognised Finland's independence on 28 January 1918. Diplomatic relations between them were established on 14 August 1918. 
The Netherlands has an embassy in Helsinki and consulates (in Kuopio, Mariehamn, Oulu, Rovaniemi, Tampere, Turku and Vaasa). Finland has an embassy in the Hague, an honorary consulate general in Amsterdam and other honorary consulates in Rotterdam and Terneuzen. Both countries are full members of the European Union. In july of 2022, the Netherlands have fully ratified Finland's NATO membership application.
the Netherlands strongly supports Finland's NATO membership.

Resident diplomatic missions 
 Finland has an embassy in The Hague.
 Netherlands has an embassy in Helsinki.

See also 
 Foreign relations of Finland
 Foreign relations of the Netherlands
 Dutch people in Finland

References

External links 
 Ministry for Foreign Affairs of the Netherlands about relations with Finland
Dutch Embassy of in Helsinki 
 Ministry for Foreign Affairs of Finland about relations with the Netherlands
Embassy of Finland in the Hague

 
 
 

 
Finland
Netherlands